Santa Colomba de Somoza, whose name is in Leonese language, is a municipality located in the province of León, Castile and León, Spain. According to the 2004 census (INE), the municipality has a population of 498 inhabitants.

Santa Colomba de Somoza in the movies  
 2005 : Saint-Jacques... La Mecque directed by Coline Serreau

References

Municipalities in the Province of León
Maragatería